Hylaeus euxanthus is a species of hymenopteran in the family Colletidae and the subgenus Gnathoprosopis. It is found in Australia.

Taxonomy
It was first described as Prosopis xanthopoda by Cockerell in 1910. In a subsequent publication in 1910, he renamed the species Prosopis euxantha due to the former name being preoccupied by Prosopis xanthopoda Vachal, 1895.''

References

Colletidae
Insects of Australia
Insects described in 1810
Taxa named by Theodore Dru Alison Cockerell